Pleistarchus (died c. 458 BC) was the Agiad King of Sparta from 480 to 458 BC.

Biography 

Pleistarchus was born as a prince, likely the only son of King Leonidas I and Queen Gorgo. His grandparents were Kings Anaxandridas II and Cleomenes I. He was born from an avunculate marriage – his parents were uncle and niece. His uncle Cleombrotus was his tutor.

Pleistarchus' father King Leonidas perished in 480 BC at the Battle of Thermopylae.  For the early part of Pleistarchus's reign, his uncle Cleombrotus acted as regent; after Cleombrotus's death in 479 BC, Pleistarchus's cousin Pausanias  was regent.

It is unknown whether Pleistarchus was married. He died without an heir, and was succeeded by Pleistoanax, son of Pausanias.

Notes 

458 BC deaths
5th-century BC rulers
5th-century BC Spartans
Agiad kings of Sparta
Ancient child monarchs
Year of birth unknown